Stockton Peak is a sharp, mostly ice-covered peak along the south side of the upper part of Murrish Glacier, 6 nautical miles (11 km) west-northwest of Cat Ridge, in Palmer Land. Named by Advisory Committee on Antarctic Names (US-ACAN) for William L. Stockton, United States Antarctic Research Program (USARP) biologist at Palmer Station in 1972.

Mountains of Palmer Land